Merrie England may refer to:

Merry England, an idealised conception of pastoral English life
 Merrie England (opera), a comic opera by Edward German
 Mutiny Bay, an area at Alton Towers formerly known as Merrie England
Merrie England, a coffee shop found in England

Books
Merrie England – in the Olden Time, George Daniel (writer) 1842
Merrie England (Robert Blatchford book), an 1893 book of essays on socialism by "Numquam", pseudonym of Robert Blatchford
Merrie England, novel by Paul Johnson (writer) 1964